Treasure in the Royal Tower is a young adult novel by Carolyn Keene in the Nancy Drew stories.

Plot summary

Nancy takes a vacation in Wisconsin when the library of the place she is vacationing at is vandalized. Nancy, along with her friends George Fayne and Bess Marvin, must survive an unknown assailant while discovering the secret passageways inside of an old castle.

Adaptation
The fourth installment in the Nancy Drew point-and-click adventure game series by Her Interactive, named Nancy Drew: Treasure in the Royal Tower, is loosely based on the novel.

1995 American novels
American young adult novels
Novels set in Wisconsin
Novels adapted into video games